Agromyces bauzanensis is a Gram-negative and aerobic bacterium from the genus of Agromyces which has been isolated from hydrocarbon-contaminated soil from Bozen in Italy.

References 

Microbacteriaceae
Bacteria described in 2010